was a Japanese physician, a prominent academic, and bacteriologist researcher. He was the discoverer of the Weil's disease pathogen.  In addition to his life's work in early 20th-century Japanese medical education, he was a pioneer in Japanese clinical cardiology and oncology.

Early life
Inada was born in Nagoya and he graduated from Tokyo Imperial University in medicine before travelling abroad for medical studies in Germany.

Career

In 1914–1915, Inada discovered the spirochete of infectious jaundice (Weil's disease); and he developed a successful serum-therapy for the infection. He is credited with ground-breaking research on the Weil's disease pathogen Leptospirosis). The initial specimen material (Stock of Ictero No.1) which Dr. Inada isolated in 1914 has been preserved as a significant artifact in the history of medicine.
The content of this paper ranged from the discovery of the pathogen, to contagion sources, clinical medicine, pathology, diagnosis, to cure.

Professor Inada was the first in Japan to import an electrocardiograph; and along with medical school colleagues, he was amongst the first to use this device clinically in Japan.  He was a prominent Japanese oncologist as well, serving as Vice President of the Japanese Society of Oncological Research from 1919 until his death in 1950.<ref>Aoki, Kunio.  [http://www.apocp.org/cancer_download/Vol2_No1/Kunio%20Aoki.pdf  Contributions to Cancer Prevention of Non-Governmental Organizations,"]  Asian Pacific Journal of Cancer Prevention, Vol 2. (2001), p. 21.</ref>
  
In 1943, he was named the President of the Japanese Medical Association, and the President of the Japan Medical Treatment Corporation. He was nominated for the Nobel prize with Dr. Kitasato Shibasaburō.

Honors
He was awarded the {{nihongo|Order of Culture|文化勲章|'Bunka kunshō'''}}.

The Maidashi campus of Kyushu University has commemorated Dr. Inada's contributions to the institution by naming one of the campus streets as Inada dōri.Notes

References
 Kobayashi, Y.  "Discovery of the causative organism of Weil's disease: historical view," Journal of Infectious Chemotherapy.'' Vol. 7, No. 1, pp. 10–15 (2001 March).

Gallery 

1874 births
1950 deaths
Japanese oncologists
Japanese microbiologists
People of Meiji-period Japan
People from Nagoya
Recipients of the Order of Culture
University of Tokyo alumni
Academic staff of Kyushu University
Japanese cardiologists